Bu or Bu, Kasih Suci (literally Mum, Pure Love) is a 2019 Malaysian Malay-language family drama film. It follows three different mothers: a housekeeper mom, a mother with adult child, a pregnant mother, and their families whose lives changes when a car accident happens. It was released on 11 April 2019 in Malaysia. It is the directorial debut of Jeany Amir.

Synopsis 
Three mothers from different background: Aishah (Nadiya Nisaa), a repressed housewife who feels estranged from her doctor husband Norman (Rashidi Ishak) and their teenage daughter Julie (Tia Sarah) as both are seldom at home, one busy with career, another with friends. Meanwhile, Norimah (Nadia Brian), a woman who finally gets pregnant after years of trying. She is supportive when her husband Hafiz (Remy Ishak) dream to become novelist. Then there is Diana (Mawar Rashid) who decides to postpone having children so she can focus on career, her husband Zack (Iedil Putra) agrees, although it upsets her mother-in-law Kak Mah (Dian P. Ramlee) who hopes to have grandchildren sooner. Zack also has financial problems with his own company.

When a car accident strikes, the lives of three women and their families collide, can the power of a mother's love prevail and how much they are willing to sacrifice for their children?

Cast 
 Remy Ishak as Hafiz
 Nadia Brian as Norimah
 Nadiya Nissa as Aishah
 Rashidi Ishak as Norman
 Dian P. Ramlee as Kak Mah
 Iedil Putra as Zack
 Mawar Rashid as Dania
 Wan Hanafi Su
 Tia Sarah as Julie

References

External links 
 Bu on Cinema.com.my
 Bu on Popcorn Malaysia

Malaysian drama films
2019 films